Shock and Awe is a live recording posthumously released by stand-up comedian and satirist Bill Hicks in 2003 on New York-based Invasion Records. It was recorded at the Oxford Playhouse, and is an abridged version of the album Salvation.

Track listing
"Hello Oxford" 10:30
"Jimmy White" 1:02
"Hooligans" 2:54
"Sniper's Nest" 2:30
"More about Smoking" 2:23
"Vote for Labour" 3:37
"Madonna's Sex Book" 1:03
"English Porno" 2:06
"Basic Instinct" 5:56
"Back to Bed America" 3:45
"Christians for the Death Penalty" 2:37
"Wrong Crowd?" 1:21
"Satan Starmaker" 3:01
"I Love Film" 2:44
"Children" 4:24
"Back in My Room" 1:52
"American Horseshit" 1:22
"I Need to Get Laid" 2:58
"On the Bright Side" 3:17
"Fuck Artists Only" 2:34
"Is There a Message" 2:43

Bill Hicks albums
Live albums published posthumously
2003 live albums
2000s comedy albums
Live comedy albums
Spoken word albums by American artists
Stand-up comedy albums